Stephen Kaus is a judge in the Alameda County Superior Court, Oakland, California, appointed by Governor Jerry Brown, effective December 2012.  Previous to his appointment Kaus was a partner practicing civil litigation attorney at Cooper, White & Cooper LLP in San Francisco, California and an occasional blog commentator on The Huffington Post. He is also the brother of journalist Mickey Kaus.

Education
Kaus received his B.A. degree in political science, cum laude, from the University of California at Los Angeles in 1970.  He also studied politics for a year at the University of Sussex.  He received his J.D. degree from the University of California at Berkeley, Boalt Hall School of Law in 1973.

Career
Kaus began his law career as a deputy public defender for Contra Costa County California from 1974 to 1980. He then moved to work as a partner at Kaus Kerr and Wagstaffe from 1982 to 1990, before starting a solo practice until 1993. He then served as a lawyer at Cooper White and Cooper LLP, making partner in 1995.

Kaus was appointed as a Superior Court Judge in 2012 after a county commissioner's spot was converted. He then ran unopposed on a 2014 ballot, with his current term set to expire in 2021.

References

External links 
Stephen Kaus: Twitter Page

Living people
American male journalists
American people of Austrian-Jewish descent
American people of German-Jewish descent
Alumni of the University of Sussex
Superior court judges in the United States
University of California, Los Angeles alumni
UC Berkeley School of Law alumni
1948 births
Public defenders